Blondie's Hero is a 1950 American comedy film directed by Edward Bernds and starring Penny Singleton, Arthur Lake, Larry Simms, and Marjorie Ann Mutchie. It is the penultimate entry of the 28 Blondie films, which ended with Beware of Blondie, released later the same year.

Plot summary
Dagwood accidentally enlists in the Army reserve. Blondie accompanies him to basic training camp.

Cast
 Penny Singleton as Blondie
 Arthur Lake as Dagwood
 Larry Simms as Baby Dumpling
 Marjorie Ann Mutchie as Cookie
Daisy as Daisy the Dog
 William Frawley as Marty Greer
 Danny Mummert as Alvin Fuddle
 Joe Sawyer as Sergeant Gateson
 Teddy Infuhr as Danny Gateson
 Alyn Lockwood as Mary Reynolds
 Iris Adrian as Mae 
 Frank Jenks as Tim Saunders

References

External links
 
 
 
 

1950 films
Columbia Pictures films
American black-and-white films
Blondie (film series) films
1950 comedy films
American comedy films
1950s English-language films
Films directed by Edward Bernds
1950s American films